Casa mia, casa mia... is a 1988 Italian comedy film directed by Neri Parenti.

Cast
Renato Pozzetto as Mario Bartoloni
Paola Onofri as Marina De Santis
Athina Cenci as Countess Salviati
Gianfranco Agus as Aldo Giannetti
Patrizia Loreti as Elvira Cappellini
Stefano Antonucci as Gianni Marini
Antonio Allocca as Franco
Clarissa Burt as Cinzia
Antonello Fassari as Di Pietro
Maurizio Mattioli as Elvira's partner
Camillo Milli as the jewellery's owner
Sonia Viviani as Aldo's wife
Alessandra Acciai as Sandra

References

External links

1988 films
Films directed by Neri Parenti
1980s Italian-language films
1988 comedy films
Italian comedy films
1980s Italian films